Perils of the Royal Mounted is a 1942 American Northern film. It was the 18th serial released by Columbia Pictures. It starred Robert Kellard (aka Robert Stevens) as the hero, Sgt. Mack MacLane of the Royal Mounties, and Kenneth MacDonald as Mort Ramsome, the head villain. It also co-starred Nell O'Day, Iron Eyes Cody, Kermit Maynard and I. Stanford Jolley.

Plot
The trading post of Sitkawan, Canada is taken by surprise when an Indian tribe attacks and massacres the settlers aboard a fur-bearing wagon train. Sergeant MacLane of the Royal Canadian Mounted Police is assigned to investigate the case. MacLane soon realises that the attackers were led by Mort Ransome, a nasty renegade, who had been conspiring with Black Bear, medicine man of the tribe, to incite the heretofore friendly Indians for his own gain. He also learns that two white renegades have kidnapped Diana Blake, daughter of the local post factor, and saves her from a runaway wagon just before it plunges over a cliff. Perils of the Royal Mounted also features stereotypically Northern genre elements including fur trappers, lumberjacks, trading posts, rebellious Indian braves, forest fires, avalanches, and a wide range of dangerous wildlife.

Cast
 Robert Kellard as Sgt. Mack MacLane RCMP (as Robert Stevens) 
 Kenneth MacDonald as Mort Ransome 
 Herbert Rawlinson as Richard Winton 
 Nell O'Day as Diane Blake
 John Elliott as Factor J. L. Blake 
 Nick Thompson as Black Bear - Indian Medicine Man
 Art Miles as Chief Flying Cloud
 Richard Fiske as Constable Brady 
 Rick Vallin as Little Wolf (as Richard Vallin)
 Forrest Taylor as Preacher Hinsdale 
 Kermit Maynard as Constable Collins
 George Chesebro as Gaspard - Henchman
 Jack Ingram as Baptiste - Henchman

Chapter titles
 The Totum[sic] Talks
 The Night Raiders
 The Water God's Revenge
 Beware, the Vigilantes
 The Masked Mountie
 Underwater Gold
 Bridge to the Sky
 Lost in the Mine
 Into the Trap
 Betrayed by Law
 Blazing Beacons
 The Mounties' Last Chance
 Painted White Man
 Burned at the Stake
 The Mountie Gets His Man
SOURCE:

Other versions
This serial was released in Latin America in March 1943, under the title Los Valientes de la Guardia, in English with Spanish subtitles.

References

External links

Cinefania.com

1942 films
American black-and-white films
1940s English-language films
Northern (genre) films
Columbia Pictures film serials
Films directed by James W. Horne
Royal Canadian Mounted Police in fiction
American Western (genre) films
1942 Western (genre) films
1940s American films